EF-hand calcium binding domain 2 is a protein that in humans is encoded by the EFCAB2 gene.

Function

The gene encodes a protein that contains two EF-hand calcium-binding domains although its function has yet to be determined. Alternatively spliced transcripts have been observed.

References

Further reading